Fodina is a genus of noctuoid moths in the family Erebidae erected by Achille Guenée in 1852.

Description
Palpi upturned, with second joint reaching vertex of head, and long third joint. Thorax and abdomen smoothly scaled. Tibia spineless, and not hairy in males. Forewings with quadrate apex.

Species

References

ZipcodeZoo.com

Calpinae
Moth genera